Fürstenfeldbruck is a Landkreis (district) in Bavaria, Germany. It is bounded by (from the east and clockwise) the city of Munich and the districts of Munich, Starnberg, Landsberg, Aichach-Friedberg and Dachau.

History

In medieval times the region was a clerical state ruled by the abbey of Fürstenfeld. When the clerical states of Holy Empire were dissolved in 1803, the territory was annexed by Bavaria. The district of Fürstenfeldbruck was established in 1939.

Geography

The district is occupied by the western Munich metropolitan area. It has the highest population density of all Bavarian districts. More than 90 percent of the population live in the eastern half of the district, which includes the suburbs of Munich.

Coat of arms
 The red and white bar is from the family arms of Saint Bernard, who had been the founder of the Cistercian order (Fürstenfeld was a Cistercian monastery)
 The crown is from the arms of the abbot Alexander Pellhammer
 The bridge represents the city of Bruck (which was later merged with Fürstenfeld to form the city of Fürstenfeldbruck)

Politics 
Fürstenfeldbruck (electoral district)

Towns and municipalities

References

External links

Official website 
Regional news platform for the Landkreis Fürstenfeldbruck 

 
Districts of Bavaria